Terelliosoma heryngii is a species of ulidiid or picture-winged fly in the genus Terelliosoma of the family Ulidiidae.

References

Ulidiidae